Pomazan is a surname. Notable people include:

 Mariia Pomazan (born 1988), Ukrainian Paralympic athlete
 Roman Pomazan (born 1994), Ukrainian footballer
 Yevgeny Pomazan (born 1989), Russian footballer

See also
 

Ukrainian-language surnames